Nathanaël Mbuku (born 16 March 2002) is a French professional footballer who plays as a forward for German  club Augsburg.

Club career
On 23 November 2018, Mbuku signed his first professional contract with Stade de Reims for three years. He made his professional debut with Reims in a 2–0 Ligue 1 win over Olympique de Marseille on 10 August 2019.

He scored his first goal in Ligue 1 in a 4–0 win against Montpellier on 25 October 2020, from an "acrobatic kick". His teammate Boulaye Dia also scored from a penalty after Mbuku was fouled. The win was Reims' first in the league in the 2020–21 season.

On 30 January 2023, Mbuku signed a four-and-a-half year contract with Augsburg in German Bundesliga.

Personal life
Born in France, Mbuku is of DR Congolese descent.

Career statistics

Honours
France U17
FIFA U-17 World Cup bronze: 2019

Individual
FIFA U-17 World Cup Silver Boot: 2019

References

External links
 
 Stade de Reims Profile
 
 

2002 births
Black French sportspeople
French sportspeople of Democratic Republic of the Congo descent
Sportspeople from Villeneuve-Saint-Georges
Footballers from Val-de-Marne
Living people
French footballers
France youth international footballers
France under-21 international footballers
Association football forwards
Stade de Reims players
FC Augsburg players
Ligue 1 players
Championnat National 2 players
Olympic footballers of France
Footballers at the 2020 Summer Olympics
French expatriate footballers
Expatriate footballers in Germany
French expatriate sportspeople in Germany